Terminalia petiolaris, commonly known as blackberry tree or billygoat plum, or marool in the local Bardi language, is a species of plant in the Combretaceae family. It is endemic to the coast of the Kimberley region of northern Western Australia.

Description
It grows as a small, deciduous tree up to 15 m in height with rough, grey bark. It produces strongly scented, cream-white flowers from February to May, and November to December. It has edible fruits, purple when ripe.

Distribution and habitat
It occurs on sandy soils, often in vine thickets. It is found in the Dampierland and Northern Kimberley IBRA bioregions.

References

petiolaris
Rosids of Western Australia
Myrtales of Australia
Plants described in 1864
Trees of Australia
Endemic flora of Western Australia